A slow fire is a term used in library and information science to describe paper embrittlement resulting from acid decay. The term is taken from the title of Terry Sanders's 1987 film Slow Fires: On the preservation of the human record.

Solutions to this problem include the use of acid-free paper stocks, reformatting brittle books by microfilming, photocopying or digitization, and a variety of deacidification techniques.

See also
Acidic paper
Acid-free paper
Double Fold
Wood-pulp paper
Preservation: Library and Archival Science

External links
 International Journal of Library Science 
Extinguishing slow fires: cooperative preservation efforts
 Slow fires: on the preservation of the human record
 Slow fires at IMDB

Preservation (library and archival science)